Mary Nutting may refer to:
 Mary Adelaide Nutting, Canadian nurse, educator, and pioneer in the field of hospital care
 Mary Olivia Nutting, author and the first librarian at Mount Holyoke College